Béla Tibor Jeszenszky a.k.a. Flipper Öcsi (1962–2008) was a Hungarian singer and rock musician. His band, Dolly Roll, achieved major success in Hungary, gaining multiple platinum albums. He played rhythm guitar and sang. He died in 2008 due to complications brought on by his longstanding alcoholism.

Early life
He's one of descendants of the noble Jeszenszky family. His maternal half-sister, Viki Marót (Viktória Marót) (b.: 1983) is singer, too.

References

1962 births
2008 deaths
20th-century Hungarian male singers